Azerbaijan competed at the World Games 2017 in Wroclaw, Poland, from 20 July 2017 to 30 July 2017.

Competitors

Gymnastic

Rhythmic Gymnastics
Azerbaijan has qualified at the 2017 World Games:

Women's individual event - 1 quota

Trampoline
Azerbaijan has qualified at the 2017 World Games:

Men's Individual Double Mini Trampoline - 1 quota

Karate 

Firdovsi Farzaliyev won the gold medal in the men's kumite 60 kg event.

References 

Nations at the 2017 World Games
2017 in Azerbaijani sport
2017